The 2009–10 Arkansas–Pine Bluff Golden Lions men's basketball team represented the University of Arkansas at Pine Bluff in the 2009–10 NCAA Division I men's basketball season. The Golden Lions, led by 2nd-year head coach George Ivory, played their home games at the K. L. Johnson Complex in Pine Bluff, Arkansas as members of the Southwestern Athletic Conference. Despite not playing a home game until the 15th game of the season, and starting the season with 11 consecutive losses, Arkansas–Pine Bluff finished second in the SWAC regular season standings. The Golden Lions then won the SWAC tournament to earn an automatic bid to the NCAA tournament. After defeating Winthrop in the play-in game, the Golden Lions advanced as the No. 16 seed in the South region where they lost to No. 1 seed and eventual National champion Duke, 73–44.

Roster

Schedule and results 

|-
!colspan=12 style=| Non-conference regular season

|-
!colspan=12 style=| SWAC regular season

|-
!colspan=9 style=| SWAC tournament

|-
!colspan=9 style=| NCAA tournament

References

Arkansas–Pine Bluff Golden Lions men's basketball seasons
Arkansas–Pine Bluff Golden Lions
Arkansas–Pine Bluff
Arkansas–Pine Bluff Golden Lions men's basketball
Arkansas–Pine Bluff Golden Lions men's basketball